Acworth is a town in Sullivan County, New Hampshire, United States. At the 2020 census, the town had a total population of 853.

History

Originally chartered by colonial governor Benning Wentworth in 1752, it was called "Burnet" after William Burnet, a former governor of the Province of Massachusetts Bay. In 1754, however, the French and Indian War broke out, and no settlements were made under the charter. Wentworth regranted the township on September 19, 1766, naming it after Sir Jacob Acworth, a former Surveyor of the Royal Navy. The town was first permanently settled in 1768 by several families from Londonderry, New Hampshire.

Acworth was incorporated in 1772 by Governor John Wentworth, but war again slowed its development. With the close of the Revolution, however, Acworth grew quickly. By 1859, it had 1,251 inhabitants, most of whom were occupied in agriculture. The Cold River provided water power for industry, including five sawmills, a gristmill, a woolen factory, a bobbin factory and a peg factory. There was also a boot and shoe manufacturer. Acworth is a source for museum-quality crystals such as beryl. The town of Acworth, Georgia, was named for this town, because this was the hometown of a railroad engineer there.

Geography
Acworth is drained by the Cold River and its tributaries, except for the northwest corner of town, which drains north to the Little Sugar River. The town lies fully within the Connecticut River watershed.

The town is crossed by one numbered state highway, New Hampshire Route 123A, which follows the Cold River and passes through the village of South Acworth. Although not numbered routes, the state also maintains a handful of other roads in the town, including Cold River Road, Hill Road, and a portion of Charlestown Road.

Adjacent municipalities
 Unity, New Hampshire (north)
 Lempster, New Hampshire (east)
 Marlow, New Hampshire (southeast)
 Alstead, New Hampshire (south)
 Langdon, New Hampshire (southwest)
 Charlestown, New Hampshire (northwest)

Demographics

As of the census of 2000, there were 836 people, 318 households, and 234 families residing in the town.  The population density was 21.5 people per square mile (8.3/km).  There were 512 housing units at an average density of 13.2 per square mile (5.1/km).  The racial makeup of the town was 96.77% White, 0.84% African American, 0.84% Native American, 0.24% Asian, and 1.32% from two or more races. Hispanic or Latino of any race were 1.08% of the population.

There were 318 households, out of which 30.8% had children under the age of 18 living with them, 60.7% were married couples living together, 6.0% had a female householder with no husband present, and 26.4% were non-families. 19.8% of all households were made up of individuals, and 7.5% had someone living alone who was 65 years of age or older.  The average household size was 2.63 and the average family size was 3.06.

In the town, the population was spread out, with 25.7% under the age of 18, 4.7% from 18 to 24, 24.0% from 25 to 44, 30.4% from 45 to 64, and 15.2% who were 65 years of age or older.  The median age was 43 years. For every 100 females, there were 101.4 males.  For every 100 females age 18 and over, there were 101.0 males.

The median income for a household in the town was $37,386, and the median income for a family was $41,397. Males had a median income of $29,792 versus $26,912 for females. The per capita income for the town was $18,132.  About 10.1% of families and 15.6% of the population were below the poverty line, including 26.6% of those under age 18 and 5.4% of those age 65 or over.

Notable people 

 George W. Anderson (1861–1938), federal judge
 Nedom L. Angier (1814–1882), mayor of Atlanta; Georgia state treasurer
 John Graham Brooks (1846–1938), sociologist, political reformer
 Thomas J. Cram (1804–1883), engineer in the service of the U.S. Corps of Topographical Engineers
 Adrian Dubois (born 1987), professional soccer player
 Alice B. Fogel, New Hampshire Poet Laureate, 2014–2019
 Perley Keyes (1774–1834), member of the New York Senate
 Talcott Parsons (1902–1979), Harvard sociologist
 Fritz Wetherbee (born 1936), television personality
 Hiram Wilson (1803–1864), abolitionist
 Joseph Gardner Wilson (1826–1873), Oregon supreme court justice and US congressman
 Urban A. Woodbury (1838–1915), Civil War veteran and the 45th governor of Vermont

See also

Bascom Maple Farms

References

Further reading

 John Leverett Merrill, History of Acworth, Acworth, New Hampshire 1869
 Helen H. Frink, These Acworth Hills –  A History of Acworth, New Hampshire 1767–1988, Town of Acworth, New Hampshire 1989

External links 

 
 Acworth Historical Society
 Acworth Silsby Library
 The Acworthian, online newsletter
 New Hampshire Economic and Labor Market Information Bureau profile
 Hayward's New England Gazetteer (1839)

 
Towns in Sullivan County, New Hampshire
Populated places established in 1772
Towns in New Hampshire